"All It Takes" is a song by New Zealand band Stellar*, released as the lead single from their second album, Magic Line (2001), in September 2001. The single peaked at number seven on New Zealand's RIANZ Singles Chart and spent 19 weeks in the top 50, becoming the band's longest-charting single. The single includes two B-sides: a differently arranged version of "You" from Stellar*'s debut album, Mix (1999), and a live version of "Violent", recorded live in Hamilton, New Zealand on 4 March 2001.

Track listing
New Zealand CD single
 "All It Takes"
 "You"
 "Violent" (live)

Credits and personnel
Credits are lifted from the New Zealand CD single liner notes.

Studios
 Recorded at The Lockup (Sydney, Australia) and Helen Young Studios (Auckland, New Zealand)
 Mastered at 301 (Sydney, Australia)

Personnel

 Boh Runga – writing
 Andrew Maclaren – writing
 Tom Bailey – production
 Stellar* – production
 Malcolm Welsford – additional production, mixing
 Luke Tomes – engineering
 Don Bartley – mastering

Charts

Weekly charts

Year-end charts

References

Stellar (New Zealand band) songs
2001 singles
2001 songs
Epic Records singles
Songs written by Boh Runga